Paul Mares (born 20 September 1963) is an Australian former professional rugby league footballer who played in the 1980s.

Playing career
Mares made his first grade debut for Parramatta in 1982 but only featured in three matches that season and was not a member of the 1982 premiership winning side.  

In 1983, Mares was part of the Parramatta side which won its third consecutive premiership defeating Manly-Warringah in the grand final.  

Mares then played in the 1984 grand final loss to Canterbury which was Parramatta's fourth consecutive grand final appearance.  

Over the next couple of seasons, Mares struggled with injuries and missed out on being selected in Parramatta's 1986 premiership winning team.  

In 1989, Mares moved to Eastern Suburbs but only managed to make six appearances before a recurring knee injury forced him into retirement.

References

1963 births
Living people
Australian rugby league players
Parramatta Eels players
Rugby league second-rows
Rugby league players from Sydney
Sydney Roosters players